Bhim Acharya (Nepali: भिम आचार्य) secretary of Communist Party of Nepal (Unified Marxist-Leninist), is the former Chief minister of Province No. 1.  Governor Somnath Adhikari appointed Bhim Acharya as the chief minister as per Article 168 (1) of the Constitution of Nepal after He was unanimously elected parliamentary party leader of the CPN (UML) on 26 August 2021, following the resignation of outgoing chief minister Sher Dhan Rai as both the parliamentary party leader and chief minister. He assumed the post of the Minister for Culture, Tourism and Civil Aviation of Nepal on 25 February 2014 under Sushil Koirala-led government.

He is a member of the 2nd Nepalese Constituent Assembly. He won the Sunsari–6 seat in 2013 Nepalese Constituent Assembly election from the Communist Party of Nepal (Unified Marxist-Leninist).

Personal life
Bhim Acharya was born on 27 April 1959 in Toliya-6, Dhankuta. He is the son of Bala Prasad and Laxmi Devi Acharya. He has obtained master's degree in management.

Political career
Acharya joined students movement in 1975. He joined Communist Party of Nepal (Unified Marxist-Leninist) in 1979.

He won the 2008 Nepalese Constituent Assembly election from Sunsari-6 constituency with 15,606 votes defeating Narendra Bahadur Basnet of Unified Communist Party of Nepal (Maoist). He was appointed as the Chief Whip of the Parliamentary Party of the Communist Party of Nepal (Unified Marxist-Leninist).

Bhim Acharya was elected as the leader of the CPN-UML's state-1 parliamentary party on 26 August 2021

References

1959 births
Living people
Chief Ministers of Nepalese provinces
People from Dhankuta District
Communist Party of Nepal (Unified Marxist–Leninist) politicians
Government ministers of Nepal
Khas people
Members of the 1st Nepalese Constituent Assembly
Members of the Provincial Assembly of Koshi Province
Members of the 2nd Nepalese Constituent Assembly
Nepal MPs 2022–present